The Argentine legislative elections of 1924 were held on 2 March. Voters chose their legislators and numerous governors, and with a turnout of 44.2%.

Background

President Hipólito Yrigoyen finished his term of office in 1922 with a prosperous economy, soaring popularity and content with leaving the Casa Rosada with his Ambassador to France, Marcelo Torcuato de Alvear. The scion of one of Argentina's traditional landed families, the well-mannered Alvear placated Yrigoyen's fears of losing control over the Radical Civic Union, a risk he insured himself against by placing his personal friend and former Buenos Aires Police Chief, Elpidio González, as Alvear's Vice-President.

Alvear continued his predecessor's social and economic policies,  including much-needed labor and pension laws, anti-trust legislation, and supporting Yrigoyen's landmark state oil concern, YPF; but his wholesale replacement of Yrigoyen appointees threw the populist leader and Vice President González against Alvear, in whose defense nine Argentine Senators left the UCR. Citing Yrigoyen's 18 gubernatorial removals (including numerous ones from his own party, and in all but one of Argentina's 14 provinces at the time), they contended that the former president had imposed a "personality cult", and established the Antipersonalist UCR (UCRA). The schism became official in 1924, when the two factions presented different candidates for that year's congressional elections.

The Antipersonalists were themselves beset by disunity, however. Five "dissident" UCR groups presented candidates in 1924, and, representing provincial interests as they did, no one faction could claim the "antipersonalist" mantle. These differed not only in their geography; but also in their ideology. The most well-established group, led by Senator Leopoldo Melo and endorsed by President Alvear, were closely associated with the landowning elite, particularly that of Buenos Aires Province, incorporated much of the declining Conservative Party, and were the least amenable to reform. The leader of the Unified UCR, Santa Fe Governor Enrique Mosca, was, likewise, conservative, whereas the Mendoza faction, led by Governor Carlos Washington Lencinas (the Lencinist UCR), was more liberal than Yrigoyen's own.

Ultimately, an acrimonious campaign atmosphere, as well as a shortage of prescient issues amid continuing prosperity, helped result in the lowest turnout since the advent of universal (male) suffrage. Yrigoyen's UCR bore the brunt of the resulting losses, giving up 19 seats in the Lower House, and, in contests held in April, 1925, 6 of their 15 seats in the Senate (though this latter was partly the result of UCRA defections). The party won only in Buenos Aires Province, where the opposition remained dominated by the Conservatives. The UCR's losses were most notable in the City of Buenos Aires, where the Socialist Party regained majorities in both the congressional delegation and City Council they had lost to the UCR in 1918. Provincial parties (as well as province-specific UCR groups) did well, and deprived the UCRA of fully benefiting from the shift. 

The elections handed no one faction of the fragmented UCR a victory; nor did it give their competitors in the reformist field (Socialists and Democratic Progressives) reason to believe they could supplant Yrigoyen in the foreseeable future. The real winner, however, was arguably President Alvear himself, who, by both default and reputation, would now be the final arbiter over the many, ongoing disputes between Antipersonalists, who nursed old wounds dating from Yrigoyen's "interventions," and Yrigoyen's faction of the UCR, who staked their future on the populist leader's return to the Presidency in 1928.

Results

References 

1924
Argentina
1924 in Argentina
March 1924 events